Watkins's antpitta (Grallaria watkinsi) or the scrub antpitta, is a species of bird in the family Grallariidae. It is found in Ecuador and Peru.

Its natural habitat is subtropical or tropical dry forest.

The common name and Latin binomial commemorate the English collector Henry George Watkins, who collected in Peru.

References

Watkins's antpitta
Birds of Ecuador
Birds of Peru
Birds of the Tumbes-Chocó-Magdalena
Watkins's antpitta
Taxonomy articles created by Polbot